Natale Juan Amprimo Pla is a Peruvian politician. He was a Member of Congress for the period 2001–2006.

He left We Are Peru, former Mayor of Lima Alberto Andrade's party, in 2004. He was Alianza para el Progreso's presidential candidate for the 2006 general election. He received 0.4% of the vote, coming in 10th place.

Biography 
He was born in Lima in 1965. Son of Orazio Amprimo and Estrella Pla.

He studied at the Colegio San Agustín in the city of Lima.

He entered the University of Lima where he studied Law and Political Science. In this house of studies he graduated as a Bachelor and obtained his law degree.

It has its own law firm; Among its outstanding clients are: the Archdiocese of Lima and Cementos Lima. In the same way, he was a lawyer and spokesman for the former mayor of Lima, Alberto Andrade.

References

External links 
Alianza para el Progreso's site

Living people
Alliance for Progress (Peru) politicians
Peruvian people of Italian descent
Candidates for President of Peru
We Are Peru politicians
Members of the Congress of the Republic of Peru
1965 births